Dowlatabad (also Romanized as Dowlatābād and Daulatābād) is a village in Jolgeh Rural District, in the Central District of Asadabad County, Hamadan Province, Iran. At the 2006 census, its population was 216, in 52 families.

References 

Populated places in Asadabad County